The Cabeza Prieta Wilderness is located in the Sonoran Desert in southwestern Arizona in the United States. Cabeza Prieta Wilderness Area has the distinction of being Arizona's largest Wilderness Area, encompassing nearly 93 percent of the Cabeza Prieta National Wildlife Refuge and covering , larger than the land area of the state of Rhode Island. It may be temporarily closed for training exercises of the Barry M. Goldwater Air Force Range.

It is also the reputed burial ground of famed environmentalist and author Edward Abbey.

Visitors to Cabeza Prieta Wilderness are advised to avoid touching or tampering with any undetonated bombs, and no vehicle travel is permitted off of designated public use roads.

See also
 List of Arizona Wilderness Areas
 List of U.S. Wilderness Areas
 Wilderness Act
 Category: Protected areas of the Sonoran Desert

Images

References

 US Fish & Wildlife Service – Cabeza Prieta NWR
 Defenders of Wildlife

External links
 Cabeza Prieta at Wilderness Connect

IUCN Category Ib
Protected areas of Pima County, Arizona
Sonoran Desert
Protected areas of the Sonoran Desert
Wilderness areas of Arizona
Protected areas of Yuma County, Arizona